Owston Ferry Castle (also known as Kinnard's Ferry Castle) was in the village of Owston Ferry, some  to the north of Gainsborough, Lincolnshire.

It is thought that the original castle on this site was erected soon after the Norman Conquest but that it was dismantled in 1095.  It was rebuilt in 1173 by Roger de Mowbray to support Prince Henry in the conflict with his father Henry II who subsequently had the castle destroyed.

The site of the motte remains as a broad grassy mound.  The surrounding area is now a Local Nature Reserve.

References

Further reading

Local Nature Reserves in Lincolnshire
Castles in Lincolnshire